McMafia: A Journey Through the Global Criminal Underworld is a nonfiction book written by Misha Glenny and published in 2008 by Random House. Glenny is a former correspondent for the BBC World Service who covered Central Europe.

Summary
According to this book, the collapse of the Soviet Union is the catalyst for organized crime to proliferate in Eastern Europe and the book essentially begins with this event. Glenny supplies first hand on-the-ground descriptions. The book itself chronicles a multinational journey of organized transnational crime in the age of the deregulated globalized market place. Glenny conducted hundreds of interviews with mainstream business people, as well as former and existent law enforcement and government officials as source material for the book.

References

External links

  The (UK) Guardian
 Osgoode Hall Law Journal. 
 Google Books
 Random House excerpt

American non-fiction books
2008 non-fiction books
Books about Russia
Organized crime activity
Organized crime in Europe
Organized crime groups in Europe